Barry Mendel (born 1963) is an American film producer. Mendel first produced Wes Anderson’s Rushmore starring Jason Schwartzman and Bill Murray, which won two Film Independent Spirit Awards for Best Director and Best Supporting Actor.  This was followed by The Sixth Sense, directed by M. Night Shyamalan, which was nominated for six Academy Awards including Best Picture. Subsequently, he produced Shyamalan's follow-up, Unbreakable, then went back to work with Anderson on The Royal Tenenbaums, which was Oscar-nominated for Best Original Screenplay. Their collaboration continued on The Life Aquatic with Steve Zissou, which Mendel followed by producing Joss Whedon’s feature film directorial debut, Serenity. Mendel next conceived, developed and produced Munich, directed by Steven Spielberg, which was nominated for five Academy Awards including Best Picture. He then produced Whip It, Drew Barrymore’s debut as a feature director, which starred Elliot Page and Kristen Wiig. Mendel produced another film with Page, Peacock, which co-starred Cillian Murphy and Susan Sarandon. 

In recent years, Mendel and Judd Apatow have become frequent collaborators. Mendel produced the Apatow-directed Funny People, This Is 40, Trainwreck and most recently The King of Staten Island starring Pete Davidson. The pair also produced Bridesmaids and The Big Sick, which were both Oscar-nominated for Best Original Screenplay, bringing to five the number of screenplay nominations for films Mendel has produced. 

He also produced Sundance Special Jury Prize-winning musical God Help the Girl, a collaboration with Stuart Murdoch of the Scottish band Belle and Sebastian, who wrote and directed the film.

Producer credits 
He was a producer in all films unless otherwise noted.

Film

Thanks

Television

References

External links 
 
 

American film producers
University of California, Santa Cruz alumni
Living people
1963 births